Viskan is a river in the south west of Sweden. It is about 140 kilometers long. It starts in the lake Tolken outside Ulricehamn and has its outlet in the Kattegatt. It runs through Borås.

References

Rivers of Västra Götaland County
Rivers of Halland County